Polo at the 2007 Southeast Asian Games was held in the VR Sport Club, Samut Prakan, Thailand.

List of events 
 Men's tournament

Medal winners

Participating Athletes

Thailand
Raksriaksorn, Apichet
Raksriaksorn, Aiyawatt
Songvanich, Chanotai
Tangcharoensathien, Thanasorn
Chuawangkham, Thanasin
Wongkraso, Satit

Philippines
Jesus, Jay D. E.
Bitong, Vicent
Veloso, Antonio
Elizalde, Santiago

Indonesia
Krisnandar, Acep
Ishak Supendi, Pepen
Sarnen, Inen
Momongan, Novel Alva
Syafar, Muhammad Harrifar
Wartono

Malaysia
Mohamas Ismail, Shaik Reismann
Tengku Sulaiman, Tengku Ahmed Shazril
Kofle, Zulkhairi
Mazlan, Saladin
M. D. Zamri, M. D. Adyrizal
Jabir Mohd Ali Moiz, Dato Mohamed Moiz

Singapore
Garcha, Satinder
Jumabhoy, Asad
Abisheganaden, Peter Jerome
Faizulah-Khan, Misrab Musa
Kin Hoong, Lawrence Khong
Ang, Ban Tong

External links
Southeast Asian Games Official Results

2007 Southeast Asian Games events
Polo at the Southeast Asian Games
2007 in polo